Derby station may refer to:

Derby bus station, in Derby, England
Derby Friargate railway station, closed railway station in Derby, England
Derby railway station, current railway station in Derby, England
Derby Road railway station, in Ipswich, England
Derby–Shelton station, the Metro-North Railroad station in Derby, Connecticut